Barry Stewart (born 3 December 1980) is an English cricketer.  Stewart is a right-handed batsman who bowls right-arm medium pace.  He was born in North Shields, Northumberland.

Stewart made his debut for Northumberland in the 1999 MCCA Knockout Trophy against the Durham Cricket Board.  Stewart played Minor counties cricket for Northumberland from 1999 to 2003, which included 9 Minor Counties Championship matches and 6 MCCA Knockout Trophy matches. He made his only List A appearance against Leicestershire in the 2000 NatWest Trophy. In this match, he took the wicket of Chris Lewis for the cost of 58 runs from 10 overs.  With the bat, he scored 2 runs before being dismissed by Anil Kumble.

References

External links
Barry Stewart at ESPNcricinfo
Barry Stewart at CricketArchive

1980 births
Living people
Sportspeople from North Shields
Cricketers from Tyne and Wear
English cricketers
Northumberland cricketers